I Salonisti is a chamber music ensemble, best known for performing as the ship's band in the 1997 James Cameron film Titanic. Founded in 1981 with the idea of specialising in "salon" music (background music played for passengers in ocean liners), I Salonisti performs both serious and light chamber music from various periods, countries and musical styles.

Its repertoire includes original compositions and new arrangements of traditional classical works, as well as popular music of the past and dance music from around the world.  In concert, I Salonisti builds its programmes around specific themes, and the music is frequently interspersed with poetry and other literary texts, slides and appearances by guest artists. The ensemble is signed to the classical music label Decca Records.

Albums
Serenata: I Salonisti Play Music Of The Grand Salon (1983)
¡Tangos! Music Of The Grand Salon (1984)
Orient Express (1989)
Trans Atlantic A Musical Voyage from the Old World to the New (1989)
And The Band Played On (Music Played On The Titanic) (1997)
I Salonisti The Last Dance Music for a Vanishing Era (1998)
Bon Voyage! A Musical Journey Around The Americas (1999)

References

External links
 I Salonisti Official Website

Chamber music groups
Swiss musical groups